Or Vandine is a Cambodian physician and politician currently serving as the Secretary of State and spokesperson for the Ministry of Health. She has been prominent in the COVID-19 pandemic in Cambodia as the Ministry of Health's spokesperson. In March 2021, she was appointed head of Cambodia's vaccination committee.

She is a Fulbright scholar and a graduate of Yale University in Master of Public Health.

References 

Cambodian physicians
21st-century Cambodian women politicians
21st-century Cambodian politicians
Women government ministers of Cambodia
Government ministers of Cambodia
Living people
Year of birth missing (living people)
COVID-19 pandemic in Cambodia
Yale University alumni